Carlos Hendricks (born August 31, 1983) is a former American football defensive back who played one season with the Chicago Rush of the Arena Football League (AFL). He played college football at the University of Alabama at Birmingham and attended Sidney Lanier High School in Montgomery, Alabama. He was also a member of the Chicago Bears, Tampa Bay Buccaneers and Rhein Fire.

Early years
Hendricks played high school football for the Sidney Lanier Poets. He recorded five interceptions and 75 tackles his senior year.

College career
Hendricks played for the UAB Blazers from 2001 to 2005. He was given a medical redshirt in 2004. He played in 46 games, starting 33 and recorded career totals of 172 tackles, five interceptions, 19 passes defensed, three forced fumbles and six fumble recoveries during his college career.

Professional career
Hendricks signed with the Chicago Bears of the National Football League (NFL) on May 16, 2006 after going undrafted in the 2006 NFL draft. He was released by the Bears on September 1, 2006.

Hendricks signed with the AFL's Chicago Rush in October 2006. He spent the 2007 season on the team's Other League Exempt list after being signed by the Tampa Bay Buccaneers. He played for the Rush during the 2008 season, recording 8.5 tackles and 3 pass breakups.

On November 16, 2006, Hendricks was signed to the practice squad of the Tampa Bay Buccaneers of the NFL. He was released by the team on November 27, 2006. He was re-signed to the Buccaneers' practice squad on December 29, 2006. Hendricks signed with the Buccaneers on January 17, 2007. He played for the Rhein Fire of NFL Europa during the 2007 season after being assigned to the team on February 24, 2007. He was released by the Buccaneers on September 11, 2007.

References

External links
Just Sports Stats
College stats

Living people
1983 births
American football defensive backs
African-American players of American football
UAB Blazers football players
Chicago Bears players
Chicago Rush players
Tampa Bay Buccaneers players
Rhein Fire players
Players of American football from Montgomery, Alabama
21st-century African-American sportspeople
20th-century African-American people